Michael Krechmer (born July 12, 1976), better known as Michael Malice, is a Ukrainian-American author, and podcaster. He is the host of "YOUR WELCOME" with Michael Malice, a video podcast which airs on Podcast One.

Malice's early life was the subject of Harvey Pekar's 2006 biography Ego & Hubris: The Michael Malice Story.

Early life

Malice was born in Lviv, a city in the former Ukrainian Soviet Socialist Republic.
Malice has a sister and two nephews. He is of Jewish heritage and grew up speaking Russian.

When he was two years old, he moved with his parents to the Bensonhurst neighborhood of Brooklyn, New York. His father originally worked as a courier and attended Baruch College to study computer science. He later worked for Merrill Lynch. Malice attended Bucknell University. Malice also worked for Goldman Sachs before quitting.

Malice is known for trolling others on social media, according to The American Conservative. His pseudonymous surname was inspired by nicknames such as Sid Vicious and Poly Styrene that were common within the punk movement and the cultural movement that centered around Andy Warhol, two cultural movements that greatly influenced Malice.

Career

Malice is the co-creator and founding editor of the humor blog Overheard in New York that posts submissions of conversations allegedly heard by eavesdroppers in New York City. Launched in 2003, the site was inspired by a conversation overheard by co-creator S. Morgan Friedman. A book based on some of the site's submissions was published in 2006.

Malice is also the subject of Harvey Pekar's 2006 biographical graphic novel Ego & Hubris: The Michael Malice Story, illustrated by Gary Dumm. As the title suggests, the biography deals with the development of Malice's egoic personality, a characteristic that Malice does not dispute.

Malice also co-authors and ghostwrites for celebrities. He is the co-author of several celebrity memoirs. He co-wrote MMA fighter Matt Hughes's 2008 autobiography Made in America: The Most Dominant Champion in UFC History. He co-wrote Concierge Confidential: The Gloves Come Off – and the Secrets Come Out! Tales from the Man Who Serves Millionaires, Moguls, and Madmen (2011) with Michael Fazio, one of New York City's most highly sought concierges to the rich and famous, Malice also co-wrote comedian D. L. Hughley's 2012 book I Want You to Shut the F#ck Up: How the Audacity of Dopes Is Ruining America and his 2016 book Black Man, White House: An Oral History of the Obama Years.

In 2014, he published his first solely authored work Dear Reader: The Unauthorized Autobiography of Kim Jong Il. It was crowdfunded through Kickstarter and published through Amazon's CreateSpace program. The book is written from the hypothetical first-person view of Kim himself and is a semi-farcical commentary on how he is portrayed to the North Korean people. Much of the material was based on English language propaganda material that Malice collected while on a week-long trip to Pyongyang, North Korea in 2012. Malice had previously recounted his experiences of his trip in a 2013 article for Reason magazine. In a generally positive review for NK News, Rob York described Dear Reader as "informative, and surprisingly earnest." 

Since 2014, Malice has been a regular guest on the Fox News and Fox Business Network shows The Independents, Kennedy, Red Eye, The Greg Gutfeld Show, The Story with Martha MacCallum, and Tucker Carlson Tonight. He is also a regular guest on The Tom Woods Show podcast and has appeared on The Joe Rogan Experience and The Rubin Report. Malice is also a regular columnist at Observer.

Malice sued former Fox News host Andrea Tantaros in October 2016, saying that he was owed $150,000 for ghostwriting her book Tied Up in Knots: How Getting What We Wanted Made Women Miserable. In an argument to keep the lawsuit under seal, lawyers for Tantaros said that if Malice's role in editing the book was revealed, "it would severely undermine her credibility in the eyes of her colleagues, fans, publisher, and the wider news-media world." Tantaros countersued Malice for defamation, saying that he had submitted fabricated evidence and colluded with Fox News to harm her reputation. Malice's lawsuit was dismissed. He appealed the dismissal and lost the appeal, too.

In 2019, Malice published his second solely-authored work, The New Right: A Journey to the Fringe of American Politics. The book is a historical analysis of the American New Right movement which contextualizes the events surrounding Donald Trump's victory in the 2016 United States presidential election.

In 2021, Malice organized and published The Anarchist Handbook, a collection of essays by various Anarchist figures, including Mikhail Bakunin, Emma Goldman, and Murray Rothbard.

In 2022, Malice published his third solely-authored work, The White Pill: A Tale of Good and Evil. The book is a historical analysis of the rise and fall of the Soviet Union and how it demonstrates the importance of hope for humanity's future.

In 2017, Malice joined Compound Media as the host of the weekly talk show YOUR WELCOME, of which Malice writes as YOUR WELCOME as a form of trolling. In 2018 "YOUR WELCOME" moved to the GaS Digital Network, and effectively converting to a podcasting platform.

Views

Malice describes himself as an anarchist or anarchist without adjectives. Reason described his politics as a combination of anarchism, objectivism, and libertarianism in 2006. In 2014, he wrote an opinion piece for The Guardian explaining why he does not vote. Malice has advocated for the peaceful dissolution of the United States.

Personal life

Malice, formerly of New York City, resides in Austin, Texas.

Bibliography

As sole author:

As editor:

As co-author:

See also

 Locals

References

External links
Official Website
Books by Michael Malice

1976 births
Living people
21st-century American male writers
21st-century American non-fiction writers
American anarchists
American columnists
American podcasters
American people of Ukrainian-Jewish descent
American political commentators
American political writers
Anarchist writers
Bucknell University alumni
Ghostwriters
Jewish American writers
Jewish anarchists
People from New York City
Soviet emigrants to the United States
Soviet Jews
Writers from New York (state)
American male non-fiction writers